The Indian National Science Academy (INSA) is a national academy in New Delhi for Indian scientists in all branches of science and technology.

In 2015 INSA has constituted a junior wing for young scientists in the country named Indian National Young Academy of Sciences (INYAS) in line with other national young academies. INYAS is the academy for young scientists in India as a national young academy and is affiliated with Global Young Academy. INYAS is also a signatory of the declaration on the Core Values of Young Academies, adopted at World Science Forum, Budapest on 20 November 2019. Prof Ashutosh Sharma is the serving president (2023-present).

History 
The Genesis: Indian National Science Academy (INSA), New Delhi is an autonomous institution of Dept. Science & Technology, Govt. of India.  However, the origins of INSA can be traced back to the founding of National Institute of Sciences in India (NISI) in the year 1935 in Calcutta (now Kolkata). The basic objective was and continues to be to promote, nurture and safeguard the  interests of sciences and scientists. The NISI was recognized by the Government of India, as a Premier National Scientific Society. NISI moved to its present premises in Delhi in 1951. A Government of India's decision in 1968 mandated INSA to represent India in all the international science fora. In 1970, NISI was given a new name- Indian National Science Academy (INSA). Its campus at the Bahadur Shah Zafar Marg came into being during 1951 with a major expansion during late 80's-mid 90's.  Today the main INSA-building stands out at Bahadur Shah Zafar Marg as seven-storied, beautifully shaped Golden Jubilee Building, completed in 1996.

Overview 
The Academy consists of Foundation fellows, Fellows (FNA) and Foreign Fellows. Election to the Academy is only by nomination. The objectives of the academy encompass promotion of science in India including its application to national welfare, safeguarding the interests of the scientists, establishing linkages with international bodies to foster collaboration and expressing considered opinion on national issues.

It plays a role in promoting, recognising and rewarding excellence in scientific research. With a view to promoting the pursuit of excellence in the field of 'Science and Technology', the academy has instituted 59 awards, placed in 4 categories, viz International Awards, General Medal & Lecture Awards, Subjectwise Medals/Lectures and Awards for Young Scientists. It also publishes journals, organises scientific discussions and brings out proceedings and monographs.

It is a signatory to the Berlin Declaration on Open Access to Knowledge in the Sciences and Humanities in 2004

Presidents 
The list of presidents of the society.

Publications
The academy publishes three peer-reviewed journals
Proceedings of the Indian National Science Academy (formerly Proceedings of the National Institute of Sciences of India)
Indian Journal of Pure and Applied Mathematics
Indian Journal of History of Science

It also publishers a year book, annual reports, INSA News, biographical memoirs, special publications and the proceedings of INSA seminars and symposia.

See also 

 Indian Academy of Sciences
 Indian National Academy of Engineering
 National Academy of Sciences, India

References

External links

Indian National Science Academy (INSA)
INSA Journals

 
National academies
National academies of sciences
Scientific organizations established in 1935
Science and technology in India
Organisations based in Delhi
1935 establishments in India
Members of the International Council for Science
Members of the International Science Council